Rathdown may refer to:
 Rathdown, County Dublin an Irish administrative barony which gives its name to:
 Dublin Rathdown (Dáil constituency)
 Dún Laoghaire–Rathdown, a county in Ireland
 Baron Rathdown, a title in the Peerage of Ireland
 Rathdown, County Wicklow, an Irish administrative barony

Similar spelling
 Rathdowney,  County Laois, Ireland
 Rathowen, County Westmeath, Ireland